Tanuj Chopra is an American film-maker. His debut feature film Punching at the Sun (2006) was screened at the Sundance Film Festival and was also nominated for the Humanitas Prize. He has directed Netflix web series Delhi Crime 2 whose first part was nominated for International Emmy

Background
Chopra was raised in Silicon Valley and obtained a Bachelor of Arts (BA) in Semiotics from Brown University in 1999. Chopra completed his MFA (Masters of Fine Arts) degree in film at the Columbia University School of the Arts in 2007, where he received the School of Art's Deans Fellowship and the FOCUS Film Fellowship.

Career
Chopra makes his films under his banner "Chops Films".

Short films
Chopra's first student film project was entitled Hate Crime (1998), which he made in the summer of 1998. As an undergraduate at Brown University, Chopra also wrote, directed and produced Uljhan, a ten-minute short film that played in festivals in New York and Los Angeles. In 2003, he directed, edited, and produced a short film love story entitled Butterfly (2003) starring Tillotama Shome (Monsoon Wedding), which was shot in New Delhi, India and screened at over 20 festivals across North America, Europe, India and Pakistan.  Butterfly went on to win several awards, including "Best Film" at the Napa Valley Wine Country Festival and the Ivy League Film Festival, the Audience Choice Award at the 2003 Asian Film Expo in Lyon, France, and a Director's Citation at the 2004 Black Maria Film and Video Festival.

In 2009, Chopra directed a short film entitled Chop Chop (2009) starring Sung Kang, Tillotama Shome and Manu Narayan.

Chopra wrote and directed a sci-fi short film in 2010 entitled Pia, starring Tillotama Shome and Pia Shah as an android/cyborg, for PBS's FutureStates project.

In 2011, Chopra directed The King's Speech Parody LOL in partnership with Center for Asian American Media (CAAM) to highlight the 29th Annual San Francisco International Asian American Film Festival's focus on South Asian film and filmmakers; the film also starred Pia Shah, Rasika Mathur and Sunil Malothra.  He also directed and wrote a short set in a dystopian future entitled Carbon Dated in 2011, which was both written by and starred Chee Malabar.

In 2014, Chopra wrote and directed a futuristic short film entitled Teacher In A Box (2014) starring Lynn Chen, Emayatzy Corinealdi, Rebecca Hazlewood and Reza Sixo Safai. The film is set in a future where teachers are replaced with digital avatars of themselves, and was also made in partnership with the PBS FutureStates project.

Web series
Chopra directed a web series, again in partnership with CAAM, entitled Nice Girls Crew in 2012, which starred Lynn Chen, Michelle Krusiec and Sheetal Sheth, and was written and created by Christine Kwon. Season 1 of the series screened in 2012, and Season 2 of the series screened in 20d and starred Leonardo Nam, Tsai Chin, Parvesh Cheena, and Anthony Ma. He also directed the season 2 of web series Delhi Crime.

Music videos
Along with Prashant Bhargava, Chopra co-directed the music video for the Swetshop Boys' "Benny Lava". Chopra also directed the music videos for the rap tracks "Harsh Truth," "Unbearable Sweetness," "Now Is Too Soon," and "Hamas 2.5," which were all performed and written by Chee Malabar. He has also directed various music videos and music pieces for jazz pianist Vijay Iyer.

Documentaries
Chopra has also worked on several documentaries. His Project Heart: Uganda series focused on the World Children Initiative's process and mission in treating children's heart disease in Uganda. His documentary SAYA! Turns Ten is a commissioned piece about the Queens, New York based non profit organization South Asian Youth Action.

Feature films
At 28, Chopra wrote, produced and directed his first feature film, Punching at the Sun (2006), about a South Asian teen named Mameet (Misu Khan) living in Queens, New York who struggles to keep his anger in check in the aftermath of 9/11 and the murder of his basketball legend brother, Sanjay. It premiered at the 2006 Sundance Film Festival as the first South Asian American film to be selected to the festival. At Sundance, it was also nominated for a Humanitas Prize. The film screened at the 2006 Tribeca Film Festival and the 2006 San Francisco International Asian American Film Festival, where it won the Jury Award for Best Narrative film. It has screened at over 30 film festivals and was released online in 2008 via Jaman.com. It currently is available to stream on Netflix and Hulu.

Chopra started work on the Kickstarter crowd-funded indie feature film Nature Boy in 2011, which tells the story of an ex-tennis champion named Nate Fox who finds himself washed up and disconnected in his home town at age 33.

Currently, Chopra is raising funds for an independent feature film entitled Chee and T. An early tagline reads: "A comedy about the only two Indian American dudes in Palo Alto who have nothing to do with technology."

Filmography

Miscellaneous
Chopra serves on the board of the Palo Alto International Film Festival, and assists with the New Voices for Youth Filmmaking Initiative .

External links

Chops Films
Filmmaker of the Month - Tanuj Chopra
CAAMedia - Filmmaker Advice from Tanuj Chopra
New York Magazine - Head-to-Head: Ajay Naidu and Tanuj Chopra
Tribeca Film Institute, Tanuj Chopra

References

American film directors
Living people
Columbia University School of the Arts alumni
Brown University alumni
American film directors of Indian descent
Year of birth missing (living people)